Inchaban  is a dormitory town in the Western region of Ghana. It is 21.6 kilometres from the centre  Takoradi, the Western regional capital.

Boundaries
The town borders Shama to the east and Aboadze to the west. The Atlantic Ocean lies to the south of the town.

References

Populated places in the Western Region (Ghana)